Aru is a village, tourist spot in the Anantnag District of Jammu and Kashmir, India. It lies 53km from Anantnag city, the district headquarter. It is located around 12 km from Pahalgam, 11 km upstream from the Lidder River. Noted for its scenic meadows, lakes and mountains, it is a base camp for trekking to the Kolhoi Glacier, Tarsar Lake, Marsar and Herbaghwan Lake. The village lies on the left bank of the Aru river, which is a tributary of the Lidder river. Jammu & Kashmir’s biggest Fodder Seed Product Station is also located in the Aru village.

Tourism 
The Aru valley is noted for its scenic meadows. It is popular among the tourists for its peaceful environment and scenic beauty.

The village is a base camp for trekkers to the Kolahoi Glacier, the Tarsar-Marsar lakes and the Katrinag valley. It is also a base for the treks to Lidderwat, the Vishansar-Kishansar lakes and Kangan. The Kolahoi is the largest glacier in the Kashmir Valley, and is located near Mt. Kolahoi (5425m), the highest peak in the Valley. A number of hotels, restaurants and huts are available for boarding and lodging.

There are about 20 alpine lakes, peaks and meadows around the Aru Valley. In the winters, when Aru receives heavy snowfall, skiing and heliskiing are practiced. Other popular tourist activities include fishing of trout in the Lidder river, trekking, hiking, horse riding, sightseeing and photography.

Overa-Aru Biosphere Reserve 

The Overa-Aru Biosphere Reserve is located 76 km from the state capital Srinagar. It has the status of a Wildlife sanctuary, and is spread over an area of 511 km2. The altitude ranges from 3000 to 5425 m above the sea level. It is famous for several rare and endangered species.

References 

Villages in Anantnag district
Hill stations in Jammu and Kashmir
Tourist attractions in Anantnag district